The D&M 22 is an American trailerable sailboat that was designed by Sparkman & Stephens as an International Offshore Rule Quarter Ton class racer and first built in 1971. The boat is Sparkman & Stephens' design #2090.

Production
The design was built by Douglass & McLeod in Grand River, Ohio, United States, starting in 1971, but it is now out of production.

Design
The D&M 22 is a racing keelboat, built predominantly of fiberglass, with wood trim. It has a masthead sloop rig, a raked stem, an angled transom, a skeg-mounted, vertically sliding rudder controlled by a tiller and a fixed fin keel or stub keel and centerboard. It displaces  and carries  of ballast.

The boat has no sliding hatch and instead uses a raised conical companionway entrance.

The boat is normally fitted with a small  outboard motor for docking and maneuvering.

The design has sleeping accommodation for four people, with a double "V"-berth in the bow cabin, a straight settee in the main cabin and an aft cabin quarter berth on the port side. The galley is located on the starboard side beside the companionway ladder. The galley is equipped with a two-burner stove, a sink and an ice box. The head is located in the bow cabin under the "V"-berth.

Operational history
A 1972 review in Motor Boating & Sailing magazine noted, "not trying to be all things to all men, Sparkman & Stephens has come up with a most unusual vessel that subordinates everything to racing (and rating) requirements. She is the only one of the four boats with five genuine berths, but the remaining accommodations are definitely Spartan. The intriguing blister top for the cabin was originally seen in racer-cruisers by the Dutch designer E. G. van de Stadt, who used it (as here) to gain headroom, to emplace the mainsheet track, and to provide a leakproof cabin top."

In a 2010 review Steve Henkel wrote, "the peculiarly shaped D&M 22 was designed by Sparkman & Stephens in 1971 to the then-new IOR (International Off-shore Rule). S&S gave her a wide beam, a bubble cabin, a raised deck, and an IOR rating of less than 18, the Rule's maximum for quarter-ton racers at the time. (The Rule has been modified several times since.) S&S's customer for this new boat was Douglass & MacLeod (D&M), a partnership originally interested mainly in small one-design racing boats. However, they had previously commissioned S&S to design the Tartan 27, a successful racer, but wanted to build something a little smaller. They offered the 22 as either a fin-keeler or a keel-centerboarder. Best features: The boat's big interior ... might be considered an advantage to cruisers; however we suspect that most customers were racers looking for a rating advantage. Worst features: It isn't totally clear why the boat was produced for only two years, but her peculiar look and her lack of big wins on the racing circuit may have been factors."

See also
List of sailing boat types

References

External links
Photo of a D&M 22
Video tour of a D&M 22

Keelboats
1970s sailboat type designs
Sailing yachts
Trailer sailers
Sailboat type designs by Sparkman and Stephens
Sailboat types built by Douglass & McLeod